The U.S. state of Virginia first required its residents to register their motor vehicles and display license plates in 1906. , plates are issued by the Virginia Department of Motor Vehicles (DMV). Front and rear plates are required for most classes of vehicles, while only rear plates are required for motorcycles and trailers.

Motor vehicle registration statistics
As of 2008, the DMV has 7,698,416 active registrations, 1,696,795 (22%) of which are special or personalized plates. In 2008, 1,624,146 pairs of license plates were sold, with 831,361 of them being personalized plates.

Passenger baseplates

1906 to 1972
The first Virginia license plate that complied with these standards was issued eight years beforehand, in 1948.

No slogans were used on passenger plates during the period covered by this subsection.

1973 to present

Non-passenger plates

Optional plates
Virginia offers 333 optional license plates. Most can be personalized for an additional fee.

Temporary plates

Type codes

References

External links
Virginia license plates, 1969−present

Virginia
Transportation in Virginia
Virginia transportation-related lists